François Bonnet (born 11 November 1947) is a French retired slalom canoeist who competed in the 1960s and the 1970s. He won a bronze medal in the C-1 team event at the 1969 ICF Canoe Slalom World Championships in Bourg St.-Maurice. Bonnet also finished 18th in the C-1 event at the 1972 Summer Olympics in Munich.

References

1947 births
Canoeists at the 1972 Summer Olympics
French male canoeists
Living people
Olympic canoeists of France
Medalists at the ICF Canoe Slalom World Championships